Podapadu is the small village in Pedakurapadu mandal in Guntur district. It is situated 30 km away from Guntur.

Demographics 
The population of Podapadu is around 1000 in which 40% of the people are Mala/Madiga  and 30% are Muslims and 20% are Kummari and rest of the people are from the Reddy community.

References 

Villages in Guntur district